Wolfram Grajetzki (born 1960, in Berlin) is a German Egyptologist. He studied at Free University of Berlin and made his Doctor of Philosophy at the Humboldt University of Berlin. He performed excavations in Egypt, but also in Pakistan. He published articles and several books on the Egyptian Middle Kingdom, on administration, burial customs and queens. He is also a researcher at the Centre for Advanced Spatial Analysis, University College London, UK, working on the project 'Digital Egypt for Universities'.

Works 
Two Treasurers of the Late Middle Kingdom  (British Archaeological Report S1007) Oxford, 2001   ISSN 0143-3067
Burial Customs in Ancient Egypt: Life in Death for Rich and Poor Duckworth Egyptology, London 2003 
Ancient Egyptian Queens: A hieroglyphic Dictionary, Golden House Publications, London 2005, 
The Middle Kingdom of Ancient Egypt: History,Archaeology and Society, Duckworth Egyptology, London 2006, 
Court Officials of the Egyptian Middle Kingdom, Duckworth Egyptology, London 2006,  (Italian translationː Dignitari di corte del Medio Regno, 2020 )
The People of the Cobra Province in Egypt: A Local History, 4500 to 1500 BC, Oxbow Books , Oxford 2020,

References 

German Egyptologists
Living people
1950 births
German male non-fiction writers
Archaeologists from Berlin